Sugar, Sugar is a song written by Jeff Barry and Andy Kim. It was originally recorded by the Archies, a fictional band of studio musicians linked to the 1968–69 US Saturday morning TV cartoon The Archie Show, inspired by the Archie Comics. In the autumn of 1969 the single topped both Billboard's Hot 100 (for four weeks) and the UK Singles Chart (for eight weeks), ranking number one for the year in both America and Britain. “Sugar, Sugar” is the most successful bubblegum pop single of all time, and is widely regarded as the apotheosis of the late-1960s/early-1970s bubblegum music genre. In mid-1970 R&B/soul singer Wilson Pickett achieved success on both the US soul and pop charts with a cover version.

The Archies version

Background
Produced by Jeff Barry, the Archies' recording of "Sugar, Sugar" features a group of studio musicians managed by Don Kirshner, former music supervisor to the Monkees. Ron Dante provided the lead vocals, accompanied by Toni Wine and songwriter Andy Kim. Together they provided the voices of the Archies using multitracking. The single was initially released in late May 1969 on Kirshner’s Calendar label (as with the Archies’ two previous singles), achieving moderate success in the early summer in several radio markets. When re-released in mid-July 1969 (with pressings also on the Kirshner label), it attained enormous success nationwide across several months. The track was also made available (along with two other Archies singles) on the back of boxes of Post  breakfast cereal Super Sugar Crisp. “Sugar, Sugar” features on the LP Everything's Archie – the second album credited to the Archies, released in November 1969.

Upon the song's initial release Kirshner had promotion men play it for radio station personnel without revealing the group's name, as the Archies' previous single, "Feelin' So Good (S.K.O.O.B.Y-D.O.O)", had peaked at no. 53 on the Billboard Hot 100 chart.  In an article published in The Washington Times, lead vocalist Ron Dante recounts that the label was removed from the record, taken to a top radio station (KYA) in San Francisco, where the program director was told: "Just play it! It's a mystery group".

"Sugar, Sugar" is written in the key of D major.

Reception
In the chart dated September 13, 1969, “Sugar, Sugar” topped the RPM 100 national singles chart in Canada, where it remained for three weeks. In the issue of Billboard magazine dated September 20, the single started a four-week run at number one on the Hot 100, replacing the Rolling Stones’ "Honky Tonk Women". It spent a then-lengthy 22 weeks on the Hot 100 (longer than any other single in 1969), and was one of only ten singles to spend 12 weeks in the Top Ten during the decade. It topped Billboard’s year-end list of the Top Hot 100 Singles of 1969. In August 1969 the record was certified gold by the  RIAA for sales of one million. (In 1989 the gold threshold was lowered to 500,000.) In 2018 “Sugar, Sugar” ranked 81 in Billboard'''s Hot 100 60th Anniversary chart.

Between late October and mid-December 1969 the single spent eight weeks at the top of the UK Singles Chart. It also peaked at number one on the South African Singles Chart. On February 5, 2006, "Sugar, Sugar" was inducted into the Canadian Songwriters Hall of Fame, as co-writer Andy Kim is originally from Montreal, Quebec.

Although official music recording sales certifications were not introduced in the United Kingdom until the British Phonographic Industry was formed in 1973, Disc introduced an initiative in 1959 to present a gold record to singles that had sold over one million units. The awards relied on record companies correctly compiling and supplying sales information, and "Sugar, Sugar" was erroneously awarded a gold disc in January 1970 despite having sold approximately 945,000 copies, as RCA Records had informed Disc that one million copies had been shipped, but not all were sold. Nevertheless, following the introduction of music downloads in 2004, "Sugar, Sugar" passed the one-million sales mark. In April 2020 the song was certified Silver by the BPI for selling 200,000 units since it was made available digitally in November 2004.

Charts

Weekly charts

Year-end charts

Certifications and sales

Personnel
The studio musicians on the Archies song are: 
Ron Dante – lead vocals
Toni Wine – backing vocals, handclaps
Andy Kim – backing vocals, handclaps
Ray Stevens – handclaps
Ron Frangipane – keyboards 
Gary Chester – drums
Joe Mack, also known as Joey Macho – bass 
Dave Appell – guitar 
Sal DiTroia – guitar

Wilson Pickett version

Background
In 1970 American R&B/soul singer Wilson Pickett recorded a cover version of "Sugar, Sugar" (titled "Sugar Sugar", with no comma) in his Criteria Studios sessions. Pickett's rendition of the song was produced by Dave Crawford, Jerry Wexler, Rick Hall and Tom Dowd. The track was released by Atlantic Records as the second single from Pickett's tenth studio album, Right On.

Reception
In May 1970 Pickett's cover of "Sugar, Sugar" reached no. 4 on Billboard's R&B chart, then in June peaked at no. 25 on the Hot 100. The parent album Right On reached no. 197 on the Billboard 200 album chart. Pickett's recording was used in Ang Lee's 1997 film The Ice Storm. In Canada, "Cole, Cooke & Redding" was the A-side and charted first, reaching no. 58 in April 1970.

Chart performance

Personnel
Wilson Pickett – vocals
Eddie Hinton, Jim O'Rourke, Jimmy Johnson – guitar
David Hood, Harold Cowart – bass
Barry Beckett, Billy Carter – keyboards
Roger Hawkins, Tubby Zeigler – drums

Other versions
Sakkarin (a pseudonym of Jonathan King) released a version of the song (as "Sugar Sugar") in 1971, reaching no. 12 in the UK chart as well as no. 20 in Ireland and no. 21 in Germany.

References

Sources
 The Billboard Book of Number 1 Hits'', fifth edition. . Billboard Books. 2003

1969 songs
1969 singles
1970 singles
Billboard Hot 100 number-one singles
Cashbox number-one singles
RPM Top Singles number-one singles
Number-one singles in South Africa
UK Singles Chart number-one singles
Number-one singles in Germany
Number-one singles in Norway
Irish Singles Chart number-one singles
Number-one singles in Austria
Number-one singles in Belgium
Number-one singles in Brazil
Number-one singles in Mexico
Number-one singles in Spain
The Archies songs
Wilson Pickett songs
Jonathan King songs
Songs from television series
Songs written by Jeff Barry
Songs written by Andy Kim
RCA Records singles
Atlantic Records singles